Keith Law may refer to:

 Keith Law (comedian), actor, director and musician
 Keith Law (writer) (born 1973), American baseball writer